Ryan Anthony Costello (born September 7, 1976) is an American politician, lobbyist and attorney who served as the U.S. representative for  from 2015 to 2019. A member of the Republican Party, he was first elected to the U.S. House of Representatives in the 2014 midterms. Costello previously served on the Chester County Board of Commissioners (2011–2015), which he chaired from 2013 to 2015. He announced his retirement from Congress in 2018 on MSNBC, stating that he would not seek reelection.

Early life
Costello was born in 1976 to schoolteacher parents. Costello attended Ursinus College and Villanova University School of Law.

Political career
Costello served on the Board of Supervisors for East Vincent Township in Chester County, Pennsylvania, for six years, serving as chairman for the last four. He was elected the Chester County recorder of deeds in 2008. He was elected to the Chester County Board of Commissioners in 2011. His fellow commissioners elected him as chairman of the commission in 2013, and reappointed in 2014.

U.S. House of Representatives

Elections
2014

He faced no primary opposition. He faced Manan Trivedi of the Democratic Party in the general election. Costello defeated Trivedi, 56%–44%.

2016

In 2016, Democrat Mike Parrish challenged Costello. Hacked material from Parrish was leaked during the campaign, but the Costello campaign took the position that they would not use the illicitly obtained materials during the election. Vincent Galko, a consultant for Costello, said, "When news broke that this material had likely been stolen by a foreign actor, we immediately said, ‘We’re not going to use it.'"

Costello was re-elected by a wide margin of 57.2 to 42.8.

Tenure 
For his first two terms, Costello represented a district that took in northern Chester County and western Montgomery County, then reached across Berks County to take in much of heavily Republican Lebanon County. However, in February 2018, the Pennsylvania Supreme Court released a new map for the state's congressional districts to replace a map which the court had previously struck down as a Republican partisan gerrymander. The court imposed a new map after the state legislature refused to submit a replacement. Costello was the only incumbent who retained his old district number. However, the 6th was made significantly more compact. It lost most of its heavily Republican western portion, as well as its share of Montgomery County. Instead, it now took in all of Chester County as well as most of the more Democratic portions of Berks County, including Reading. Even before the old map was thrown out, Costello had already attracted a well-financed Democratic challenger, entrepreneur and Air Force veteran Chrissy Houlahan.

According to The Philadelphia Inquirer, "Of the many Republicans who took a political blow from Pennsylvania's new congressional map, Chester County's Ryan Costello got hit the hardest." The new 6th was significantly more Democratic than its predecessor. Had the redrawn district existed in 2016, Hillary Clinton would have won it with 52 percent of the vote to Donald Trump's 43 percent; Clinton carried the old 6th with 48 percent of the vote. Along similar lines, Nate Cohn of The New York Times wrote that the new map put Costello in "very serious trouble," and wondered if Costello would even run for a third term.

The Philadelphia Inquirer wrote that "the previous, GOP-drawn map was one factor aiding Republicans as they held a firm grip on every competitive seat in the moderate Philadelphia suburbs." According to the Pottstown Mercury, the Republican-drawn congressional map was "widely viewed as among the nation’s most gerrymandered." After the new congressional map was released, Costello said he supported impeaching the justices who imposed the map, calling the court corrupt and undemocratic. Republicans requested that the United States Supreme Court intervene in the redistricting dispute, although Politico reported that the Republican challenge was unlikely to be successful. In March 2018, a panel of federal judges refused to block the new congressional map from going into effect.

In March 2018, Costello filed petitions to get on the 2018 ballot, but later that month, he announced that he was dropping his reelection bid. According to The Hill, he became frustrated with the Trump administration, which contributed to his dropping from the race.

After announcing his retirement, CNN called him a "rare brand in the House GOP conference: a young moderate willing to break with his leadership and his President on everything from gun control bills to repealing and replacing the Affordable Care Act." While FiveThirtyEight evaluated Costello's voting record and found that he "voted in line with Trump's position 95.5% of the time," a ranking by the Lugar Center showed Costello was the ninth most bipartisan member of Congress in 2017 and held the second highest bipartisan ranking of any member of Pennsylvania's congressional delegation. In addition, according to data from Quorum, Costello was ranked number five in the top ten Republican members who vote against their own party. Houlahan went on to win the November general election against Greg McCauley.

Political positions
Throughout his tenure, Costello was ranked as one of the most bipartisan Members of Congress, breaking with his party to support environment, health care, and education initiatives. In 2017, Costello ranked ninth out of 435 Members of Congress in bipartisanship.

In May 2017, Costello broke from his party and voted against the Republican health care legislation, the American Health Care Act (AHCA).

In November 2017, Costello voted for the Republican Party's 2017 tax plan that passed the House. He also voted in favor of a 2018 bipartisan bill to fund the federal government.

Electoral history

Pennsylvania's 6th Congressional District election, 2014

Pennsylvania's 6th Congressional District election, 2016

Committee assignments
115th Congress
 Committee on Energy and Commerce
 Subcommittee on Communications and Technology
 Subcommittee on Digital Commerce and Consumer Protection
 Subcommittee on Oversight and Investigations
114th Congress
 Committee on Transportation and Infrastructure
 Subcommittee on Economic Development, Public Buildings and Emergency Management
 Subcommittee on Highways and Transit
 Committee on Veterans' Affairs
 Subcommittee on Disability Assistance and Memorial Affairs
 Subcommittee on Economic Opportunity

Caucus memberships
 Climate Solutions Caucus

Post-political career
After leaving Congress in January 2019, he announced the formation of Ryan Costello Strategies, a consulting firm. In October 2019, it was reported that he planned to register as a lobbyist following the mandatory one-year cooling off period.

Personal life
Costello lives along with his wife and two children in West Chester, Pennsylvania. He is a Presbyterian.

References

Further reading

External links

 
 
 

|-

|-

|-

1976 births
21st-century American lawyers
21st-century American politicians
Living people
People from West Chester, Pennsylvania
Republican Party members of the United States House of Representatives from Pennsylvania
Ursinus College alumni
Villanova University School of Law alumni
Chester County Commissioners (Pennsylvania)